ASMALLWORLD (ASW) is a media company and a social network based in Zürich, Switzerland. The company markets itself as "the world's leading travel & lifestyle community" and offers its services to travellers around the world. 

Centred around the ASMALLWORLD social network, the company operates a group of travel and lifestyle businesses which aim to inspire and enable its customers to travel better, experience more, and make new connections.

Membership 
The social network has a membership subscription model; offering three different tiers: the basic ASMALLWORLD, Prestige and Signature. The company provides access to over 1,000 events per year in 150 cities worldwide, including in-person ones like wine tastings, art gallery openings, weekend trips but also virtual ones like Live visits of remote hotel properties or webinars on sustainable travel.

Member services
ASMALLWORLD includes a communication platform and a service platform, for "a private international community of culturally influential people, connected by three degrees." Members create user profiles and can use the online calendar and private messaging. The site also offers over 100 "city guides" written by its members detailing and rating restaurants, bars and nightclubs. To facilitate meetups, ASW’s site has a “Geolocator” tool, which allows users to post travel plans as well as browse and comment on the travel plans of other members. Members can also view upcoming ASW-hosted events in different cities. The website also offers members an online marketplace, employment website, networking and investment opportunities, rental property, and roommate search. Using the website’s Internet forums, members can exchange advice on travel and business, or converse.

Events
Annually, in mid-December, over 200 members attend the Winter Weekend at the Gstaad Palace in Gstaad, Switzerland, where members can join in skiing, wine tastings, dinners, and black tie receptions. The company also hosts summer events in Saint-Tropez, costing members €2,000-€4,000/person, and sometimes Marbella.

History
In March 2004, Erik Wachtmeister and his wife, Louise Wachtmeister, founded  ASmallWorld.

It was dubbed "MySpace for millionaires" by The Wall Street Journal.

To maintain its desired exclusivity, ASmallWorld, while initially free, was invitation-only, open only to those invited by an existing member. In October 2004, the platform had 30,000 users, mostly celebrities, models and bankers between 25 and 35 years old, living in Europe or North America. 

By August 2005, the platform had 68,000 members.

In May 2006, Harvey Weinstein's The Weinstein Company acquired a majority stake in the platform. Other investors included former AOL COO Robert W. Pittman, film director Renny Harlin, and entrepreneur Prince Alexander von Fürstenberg. At the time, A Small World had approximately 130,000 members. Harvey Weinstein said his company planned to expand the site's membership and bring in additional advertisers. It was the Weinstein Company's first investment in an Internet company. After launching online advertising in 2006, the website had 100 partners. Advertisers included Jaguar Cars, Diane von Furstenberg, Mercedes-Benz, Cartier, and Moet & Chandon.

In October 2009, Swiss entrepreneur and investor Patrick Liotard-Vogt purchased a controlling stake in ASMALLWORLD and became its chairman. Sabine Heller became chief executive officer. At that time, membership was in excess of 500,000 members.

In December 2010, members donated €40,000 to a sex trafficking prevention charity run by Somaly Mam. At the 2012 Winter Weekend in Gstaad, members raised $95,000 for the Alzheimer's Society. Carey Mulligan, an Ambassador for the Alzheimer's Society, was present at the meeting.

In July 2012, the company launched a mobile app for iOS. A mobile app for Android followed.

In February 2013, ASmallWorld announced that as of March 1, 2013, it would not be accepting new members, citing an initiative to ensure the integrity of the community. The company changed its strategy to focus on a smaller network and more perks for its members. After temporarily shutting down, ASW relaunched in May 2013 with a membership model and an advertising-free experience for its members.

In March 2013, it acquired World's Finest Club, which offers exclusive access to clubs worldwide.

In April 2013, the company purged many members from its rolls, reducing its user base from 850,000 to 250,000 members.

On March 20, 2018, ASMALLWORLD AG became a public company via an initial public offering on the SIX Swiss Exchange, raising CHF 18 million.

In September 2018, the company acquired First Class & More International.

In February 2019, the company acquired a UK-based travel agency LuxuryBARED and integrated into the ASW App and website, after having invested heavily into technology and team.

In March 2019, ASW Hospitality became the property manager for the North Island, a Luxury Collection Resort, Seychelles, a Marriott International-branded hotel. Dario Bertucci was named managing director of ASW Hospitality.

See also
 List of social networking websites

References

External links
 

Swiss social networking websites
Internet properties established in 2004
Companies listed on the SIX Swiss Exchange